Zoetermeer Stadslijn is a light-rail line converted from a former commuter rail line in the Netherlands, between The Hague and Zoetermeer.

History
Originally, the line was managed by the Dutch Railways (NS). Since June 2006, it has served as a light-rail line, using trams. The light-rail connection, combined with The Hague-Rotterdam line, is called the RandstadRail.

After the Oosterheem neighbourhood was built in Zoetermeer, an extra track was added. It does not take the round line, unlike the other routes, but splits between Seghweart and Leidsewallen stations.

Lines
Since the extra Oosterheem line was added, two lines reach the Zoetermeer Stadslijn and are called line 3 and line 4. Line 3 uses the older track, and line 4, or the Oosterheem line, takes the newer track. In 2020 a new line 34 was added combining the routes of line 3 in The Hague and that of line 4 in Zoetermeer.

Line 3
Line 3 takes the old track and makes a lap. At Centrum West, it turns and circles back over the whole track to Den Haag Centraal Station.

Route
The route starts at Den Haag, passes through Voorburg and Leidschendam, and continues through Den Haag Leidschenveen, at the following stops:

 Den Haag CS
 Beatrixkwartier
 Laan van NOI
 Voorburg 't Loo
 Leidschendam-Voorburg
 Forepark
 Leidschenveen

Then, it enters Zoetermeer at station Voorweg Laag. In Zoetermeer has the following stops:
 Voorweg Laag
 Centrum West
 Stadhuis
 Palenstein
 Seghwaert
 Leidsewallen
 De Leyens
 Buytenwegh
 Voorweg Hoog
 Meerzicht
 Driemanspolder (NS station Zoetermeer)
 Delftsewallen
 Dorp
 Centrum West

At the end of the route, the vehicle turns around and drives the route back to Den Haag.

Line 4
Line 4 takes the same route as line 3 until Seghwaert, where it splits and goes into the Oosterheem neighbourhood.

Route
The route starts at Den Haag and goes through Voorburg and Leidschendam and Den Haag again, just like line 3. In Zoetermeer it has the following stations:

 Voorweg Laag
 Centrum West
 Stadhuis
 Palenstein
 Seghwaert
 Willem Dreeslaan
 Oosterheem
 Javalaan
 Lansingerland-Zoetermeer

That is the end of the track.

Line 34 
On this part of the route the stops are identical to that of line 4

References

Light rail in the Netherlands
Zoetermeer